Doctor Schäfer (German: Frauenarzt Dr. Schäfer) is a 1928 German silent film directed by Jacob Fleck and Luise Fleck.

The film's sets were designed by the art director Max Heilbronner.

Cast
 Leopold Kramer as Professor Hausen  
 Evelyn Holt as Evelyne Hausen, seine Tochter 
 Iván Petrovich as Dr. Schäfer, Frauenarzt  
 Agnes Petersen-Mozzuchinowa as Lucie Walker, Freundin Evelynens 
 Hans Albers as Dr. Greber  
 Imre Ráday as Charleston, Professor Hausens Neffe

References

Bibliography
 Hans-Michael Bock and Tim Bergfelder. The Concise Cinegraph: An Encyclopedia of German Cinema. Berghahn Books.

External links

1928 films
Films of the Weimar Republic
Films directed by Luise Fleck
Films directed by Jacob Fleck
German silent feature films
German black-and-white films